King Ratnam is a Sri Lankan actor and film director. He is regarded as a talented filmmaker in the nation as he directed numerous advertisements, short films and documentary films. He played a key role in the production of a Sri Lankan made Tamil language feature-length film after 40 years in the Sri Lankan Tamil cinema history as the director of the film titled, Komaali Kings. His attempt to rekindle and re-establish nostalgic memories of the hay days of Sri Lankan Tamil cinema is set to be one of the turning points in Sri Lanka's resilience from the lost glory in the Tamil cinema industry.

Biography 
King Ratnam comes from a family with a background of art and cinema. He is the grandson of the famed stage, radio and film artist M.S. Ratnam.

He is the younger brother of Jude Ratnam, also a fellow film director who is known for successfully directing the short documentary film Demons in Paradise related to July 1983 riots.

Career 
King was in the 2012 film, Ini Avan before making his acting debut in the 2016 Sinhala romantic film, Let Her Cry. Apart from acting, he also became a professional director as he was inspired by his elder brother, Jude Ratnam. King Ratnam rose to prominence as a director through the Sri Lankan short documentary film, Echoing Hills which was released in 2014 and got positive reviews. He made his directorial debut in a feature-length film for the first time through the film, Komaali Kings. He himself plays an important role as "Pat" in the film.

References

External links 
 
 

Living people
Date of birth missing (living people)
Place of birth missing (living people)
Sri Lankan male film actors
Sri Lankan Tamil actors
21st-century Sri Lankan male actors
Sri Lankan film directors
Sri Lankan Tamil film directors
Year of birth missing (living people)